Desi pub is a colloquial term used in the United Kingdom to describe a public house which is owned or managed by a landlord of Indian origin. These establishments generally serve Punjabi food while maintaining elements of the traditional British pub, such as ale and pub games. The concept of the Desi pub originated during the 1960s following widespread migration from the Indian subcontinent to the UK. Desi pubs have been cited as a successful example of cultural integration between Asian and British communities.

History

The introduction of the British Nationality Act 1948 following the breakup of the British Empire and the end of the Second World War precipitated a marked increase in the number of immigrants arriving in the United Kingdom from former Commonwealth nations. Between 1951 and 1971, it is estimated that the British Indian population grew from just over 30,000 to around 483,000. These new arrivals were not well received by some sections of society and many establishments introduced colour bars, including some pubs which had separate "white" and "coloured" rooms. In 1965, human rights activist Malcolm X was invited by Avtar Singh Jouhl of the Indian Workers' Association to visit one such pub, the Blue Gates in Smethwick, near Birmingham, to experience this discrimination first-hand and protest against racial segregation in the town.

Three years earlier, the first known landlord of Asian origin in a British pub, Sohan Singh, had taken over at the Durham Ox in Leicester. The brewery which owned the pub had apparently chosen an Indian manager for it as many of its clientele were from multi-ethnic backgrounds. In 1968, Hans Raj Dhanjal became the first Indian publican in the Black Country when he leased the Heart of Oak, a Mitchells & Butlers pub in Whitmore Reans, Wolverhampton. These bars spread throughout the region during the 1970s, often taking over struggling traditional pubs and targeting them towards a new customer base. They came to be known as Desi pubs; the term "Desi" is borrowed from Hindustani and is derived from the Sanskrit word for "land" or "country".

As the number of Desi pubs grew, several pubs which had previously been meeting places for racist groups such as the National Front or which had barred non-white customers eventually became Indian-owned themselves, including the Blue Gates. Desi pubs also appeared further afield, including the Glassy Junction in Southall, west London, which accepted payments in Indian rupees as well as pounds sterling. Most modern Desi pubs are gastropubs, serving Punjabi dishes such as saag and chicken tikka as well as traditional British pub drinks like beer and ale. Although Indian-owned, the pubs are popular with people from all different communities, including Caribbean, Somali and Eastern European. As of 2016, there were more than fifty Desi pubs in the Black Country area.

In popular culture
In 2010, Desi pubs were the subject of a BBC Radio 4 documentary presented by Punjabi disk jockey Bobby Friction. The programme explored how the pubs had helped to bring diverse communities in the West Midlands closer together, but also commented on the issue of alcohol-related illness among South Asian men. Creative Black Country, an arts collaborative based in West Bromwich, has collated an extensive body of media related to Desi pubs, including portrait photographs, pub signs and stained glass windows. Part of the collection was displayed at the Royal Festival Hall in 2016 as part of the Alchemy festival of South Asian culture, following which some of the signs and windows were installed in Desi pubs around the Black Country.

In his 2012 book on modern British history, Hope and Glory, author and radio presenter Stuart Maconie called the Desi pub  "one of the most welcome additions to the Midlands high streets" and described the combination of Indian food and British beer "a delicious tableau of integration".

References

Pubs
Types of drinking establishment
Restaurants by type
British culture
Punjabi culture